The Pakistan Army Aviation Corps (Army Aviation Corps), abbreviated as Avn, is the aviation corps of the Pakistan Army, tasked with providing close aerial combat support and aerial logistics for the Pakistan Army.

History
Originally formed by British Army Air Corps in 1942, the entire unit was transferred to Pakistan in 1947. The officers and personnel were part of the Air Observation Post who were deployed in support of Punjab Boundary Force. Later the entire group was stationed at Chaklala Air Force Base before the partition of India.

Initially part of Pakistan Air Force, the Corps was split into the new service and became part of Pakistan Army in 1958.  The Corps of Electrical and Mechanical Engineering started to maintain the aircraft and helicopters given by the United States Army Aviation Branch, opening its own aviation school in 1959.

Since the 1960s, the corps expanded in momentum, manpower, and its operational scope has widened. By the 1970s, the Corps became a fighting air component of the Pakistan Army, with its attack helicopters becoming the backbone of military operations. The Corps has become an integral part of Pakistan Army's every imitated operations, and came to public and international notice in the 1970s after initiating, and successfully quelling, the serious civil war in Balochistan.

It is also a most decorated Corps of Pakistan Army, with more national citations and awards conferred and bestowed to this Corps than any combatant corps of Pakistan Army. Although it came into existence in 1947, the corps was given a full commission in 1977.

Combat operations

As for its war capabilities, the Corps has a long history; participating in every conflict and war with India, they also led and flew bombing and combat missions in the Afghanistan war, Somalian War, Sierra Leone war, Mozambique war, Sri Lankan war Bosnian war, and recently, the War in North-West Pakistan. The corps has actively participated in Siachin Conflict, Kargil Conflict and War on Terror. The daring pilots of Pakistan Army Aviation have conducted some of the most historic and difficult missions in Aviation history, in pursuit of which some of them laid down their lives. They are known for their professionalism for high altitude flying, combat, assault and rescue missions.

The Corps also initiated the non-combatant operations in 2005, when it led a massive airlift and re-location mission after the Kashmir earthquake. In 1991, the Corps was stationed in Bangladesh, where they completed its non-combat mission after the country was hit with a cyclone. Since its inception, the Corps has become a significant combatant arm of the Pakistan Army, poised for a definite and critical role be it peace or war.

Aircraft inventory

Pakistan Army operates 314+ helicopters alongside several fixed-wing aircraft.

3 CAIC Z-10 attack helicopters of China were delivered for trial use so that orders could be made in the future. However, as of 2018, no orders have been made further and replaced by TAI/AgustaWestland T129 ATAK, this could mean that these 3 helicopters were returned with no follow-up order.

15 Bell AH-1Z Viper with Hellfire missiles, equipment and support worth $952 million were on order but were not delivered due to political tensions between the U.S. and Pakistan.

30 TAI/AgustaWestland T129 ATAK worth $1.5 billion is on order however production is still on hold due to the United States not giving export license for the engine, which is of American origin. New Turkish indigenous engine as a replacement is currently on trials.

After the United States fail to deliver the AH-1Z and the problems with the Turkish T129, Pakistan Army again is showing interests in Chinese all-weather, multirole CAIC Z-10ME which is the advanced & upgraded variant of CAIC Z-10

Retired Aircraft
Auster 5 1947-1957
Auster AOP.6 1947-1957
Cessna O-1 Bird Dog 1957-1990
Beechcraft U-8F Seminole 1963-1983
Bell Model 47 1964-1990
Bell OH-13 Sioux 1964-1990
Mil Mi-8 1969-1998

Notable accidents and incidents
 2022 Pakistan Army helicopter incident
 29 March 2022 – Eight UN peacekeepers, six Pakistanis, a Russian and a Serb, part of the United Nations Stabilization Mission in the Democratic Republic of the Congo were killed in a crash of a Puma helicopter operated by the Pakistan Army Aviation Corps while on a reconnaissance mission in the troubled eastern Democratic Republic of Congo. Cause of the crash is yet to be ascertained.
 2019 Pakistan Army military plane crash
 2015 Pakistan Army Mil Mi-17 crash
 2009 Pakistan Army Mil Mi-17 crash

Units
 31 Army Aviation Combat Squadron* 33 Army Aviation Squadron* 6 Aviation Squadron (ERC)

See also
 Pakistan Air Force
 List of active Pakistan Air Force aircraft
 Pakistan Naval Air Arm
 Equipment of the Pakistan Army

References

External links

 
Aviation
Military units and formations established in 1947
Army aviation units and formations
1947 establishments in Pakistan